Daniel Amuke (born 5 November 1949) was a Kenyan sprinter. He competed in the men's 100 metres at the 1972 Summer Olympics.

References

External links

1949 births
Year of death missing
Athletes (track and field) at the 1972 Summer Olympics
Kenyan male sprinters
Olympic athletes of Kenya
Place of birth missing
20th-century Kenyan people